The Ty Cobb Healthcare System in Royston in the US state of Georgia began as a single hospital in 1950, with a donation by baseball player Ty Cobb. Since then it grew to include a new medical center, smaller local health centers, and hospitals.

Ty Cobb Healthcare System is a private self-supporting nonprofit health care organization consisting of Cobb Memorial Hospital, Cobb Memorial Outpatient Diagnostic Center, Brown Memorial Convalescent Center, Cobb Health Care Center, Home Base Health Services, Hart County Hospital, Cobb Center Apartments, Inc. and Ty Cobb Regional Medical Center. Building the latter medical center (in 2010) made the system run a debt of over $60 million; in 2015, the Ty Cobb Regional Medical was taken over by St. Mary's Health Care and its parent, Trinity Health, for $12.9 million.

History 
Ty Cobb donated $100,000 in January 1950 to help his hometown of Royston, Georgia, build a 24-bed hospital, fitted with the latest equipment. The institution was initially run by Cobb's boyhood friend, Dr. Stewart Brown. The original Board of Directors of the proposed hospital held their organizational meeting at the home of Dr. and Mrs. Stewart Brown, Sr. on November 6, 1947. Dr. Brown, a widely respected physician and surgeon, served as Cobb Memorial Hospital's first superintendent. In 2009 the hospital system controversially closed the hospital and moved it to Lavonia, Ga.

Elements

Ty Cobb Regional Medical Center
Ty Cobb Healthcare System Incorporated announced on June 10, 2009, that it would close down Cobb Memorial Hospital and Hart County Hospital consolidating them into a new $52 million, 56-bed, regional medical center in the nearby town of Lavonia, called Ty Cobb Regional Medical Center. Ty Cobb Healthcare System applied to the state Department of Community Health in mid-July for formal permission to build the new hospital.

Cobb Memorial Hospital
Cobb Memorial Hospital in Royston is a 71-bed medical and surgical facility includes a modern birthing center, a 24-hour emergency department, and a state of the art Outpatient Diagnostic Center.

Hart County Hospital
Hart County Hospital is an 82-bed, full-service hospital that serves Hart, Franklin, and Elbert counties and the surrounding areas. Fully accredited by the Joint Commission on Accreditation of Healthcare Organizations (JCAHO), the hospital has over 83 doctors, 200 support staff members, and a 24-hour emergency department.

Other elements
Brown Memorial Convalescent Center is a 144-bed hospital-based long-term care facility located adjacent to Cobb Memorial Hospital in Royston.
Hartwell Health Care Center is a 92-bed hospital-based long-term care facility located in Hartwell, Georgia.
Cobb Health Care Center is a 116-bed hospital-based long-term care facility located in Comer, Georgia. 
The Gables at Cobb Village is a 48-bed special residential community serving senior adults with assisted living services.
Cobb Center Apartments, Inc.  is a 24-unit HUD independent living housing project.

References

External links

Hospital networks in the United States
Healthcare in Georgia (U.S. state)
Buildings and structures in Banks County, Georgia
Buildings and structures in Jackson County, Georgia
Buildings and structures in Franklin County, Georgia
Buildings and structures in Madison County, Georgia
Buildings and structures in Elbert County, Georgia
1950 establishments in Georgia (U.S. state)
Hospitals established in 1950
Ty Cobb
Medical and health organizations based in Georgia (U.S. state)